Rififi in Amsterdam may refer to:

 Rififi in Amsterdam (1962 film)
 Rififi in Amsterdam (1966 film)